This is a list of mayors of Lugano, Ticino, Switzerland. The mayor of the city of Lugano (sindaco di Lugano) chairs the municipal council (municipio).

References 
Sindaci di Lugano dal 1803. Retrieved 25 March 2022.

Lugano
Lugano